The Men's team sprint at the European Track Championships was first competed in 2010 in Poland.

The Team sprint consists of a qualifying, followed by a final and the race for the bronze medal.

Germany have been the most successful nation in the event at this level, winning the first five events, before their run was ended by Netherlands in 2015. Robert Förstemann  is the most successful individual medalist in the discipline, with four golds and two bronze medals in seven years; his single absence when he did not feature in the winning German team of the post-Olympic 2012 event. François Pervis's four silver medals for France remains the most decorated non-German cyclist in the event, while Polish sprinters Maciej Bielecki and Kamil Kuczyński each have a gold, a silver and a bronze medal.

Medalists

References

2010 Results
2011 Results
2012 Results

 
Men's team sprint
Men's team sprint (track cycling)